"È l'amore che conta" is a song written by Italian singer Giorgia, busbee, Allan Rich and Jud Friedman and released on 9 September 2011 as the second single from Giorgia's album Dietro le apparenze. The single, issued by Dischi di cioccolata and distributed by Sony Music Entertainment, peaked at number 9 on the Italian Top Digital Download chart, and it was certified platinum by the Federation of the Italian Music Industry for domestic sales exceeding 60,000 units.

Music video
Shot in Venice, the video was made available for viewers on October 6, 2011 in a preview in corriere.it, and on YouTube on October 7, 2011.

Covers
 The Ukrainian singer Ani Lorak released a cover in 2012 of the song, titled .
 The Dutch singer Glennis Grace released a cover in 2012 of the song, titled .

Chart performance

References

2011 singles
Songs written by busbee
Italian-language songs
2011 songs
Songs written by Jud Friedman
Music videos shot in Venice